Alex Rider may refer to:

 Alex Rider, a young adult spy series by Anthony Horowitz
 Alex Rider (character), the protagonist of the eponymous series
 Alex Rider: Stormbreaker (video game), a video game released in conjunction with the 2006 film Stormbreaker
 Alex Rider (TV series), an Amazon Prime television adaptation of the novel series